Sarah Jane Mahina-A-Rangi Morton (born 28 August 1998) is a New Zealand footballer who currently plays for Western Springs. She has represented New Zealand at both age group and senior international level.

Morton was a member of the New Zealand U-17 side at the 2014 FIFA U-17 Women's World Cup in Costa Rica, the New Zealand U-20 side at the 2016 FIFA U-20 Women's World Cup in Papua New Guinea, and again at the 2018 FIFA U-20 Women's World Cup in France.

Morton made her senior début for the Football Ferns as starting left fullback in a 1–3 loss to Japan on 10 June 2018.

International goal
Scores and results list New Zealand's goal tally first.

References

External links

1998 births
Living people
New Zealand women's association footballers
New Zealand women's international footballers
Women's association football forwards
2019 FIFA Women's World Cup players